The Choice (2008) is a philosophy book, where the author Eliyahu M. Goldratt explains his way of thinking about reality and the consequences of thinking clearly. The book is structured as a dialogue between the author and his daughter Efrat, where he attempts to explain clearly the way he thinks, and the obstacles that prevent people from thinking in the same fashion. Interspersed between the dialogues are short cases that demonstrate or further explore the points raised in the discussion.

The content of this book might be seen as explaining the basic principles upon which are based the Theory of constraints thinking processes.

In the revised edition (2010) Efrat's own notes are included as she made during the conversation with her father, helping the reader determine the true essence of the book.

2008 non-fiction books
Philosophy books